During the 1918–19 season Hibernian, a football club based in Edinburgh, finished twentieth out of 18 clubs in the Scottish First Division.

Scottish Football League

Final League table

Victory Cup

See also
List of Hibernian F.C. seasons

References

External links
Hibernian 1918/1919 results and fixtures, Soccerbase

Hibernian F.C. seasons
Hibernian